Zemfira Safarova (born 10 June 1937) is an Azerbaijani and Soviet musicologist, doctor of art history, professor (1998), full member of the Azerbaijan National Academy of Sciences (2017), Honored Artist of the Azerbaijan SSR (1989), Honored Worker of Science of the Azerbaijan SSR, and laureate of the Humay Award.

Biography 
Zemfira Safarova was born on June 10, 1937 in Kislovodsk, USSR, in the family of oil engineer Yusif Safarov. In 1960 she graduated from the Faculty of Theory and Composition of the Baku Academy of Music, in 1966 she completed her postgraduate studies at the Institute of Architecture and Art of the Azerbaijan National Academy of Sciences (headed by I. Ya. Ryzhkin). In 1970 she defended her Ph.D. thesis on the topic “Musical and aesthetic concept of Uzeyir Hajibeyov”.

From 1959 to 1962 she taught at the ten-year music school at the Baku Academy of Music. Since 1966 he has been a researcher (since 1975 a senior researcher), and since 1980 he has been the head of the department of Azerbaijani musical art at the Institute of Architecture and Art of the Academy of Sciences of the Azerbaijan SSR. She became a full member of Azerbaijan National Academy of Sciences in 2007. Since May 2, 2017, he is an academician of the Azerbaijan National Academy of Sciences.

Awards 
 Honored Artist of the Azerbaijan SSR (1989)
 Honored Worker of Science of the Azerbaijan SSR
 Laureate of the Humay Award

References

Living people
1937 births
Academic staff of the Baku Academy of Music
Azerbaijani musicologists
Soviet musicologists
Honored Art Workers of the Azerbaijan SSR
Baku Academy of Music alumni